The 2009–10 National League B season was the season played in the National League B, Switzerland's second-tier professional ice hockey league, during 2009 and 2010. EHC Visp won the regular season championship, with a one point edge over second place EHC Olten. The winner of the playoffs was Lausanne HC, the third-ranked team of the regular season.

References
Elite Prospects

Switzerland
National League B seasons
2009–10 in Swiss ice hockey